Women's long jump events for blind & visually impaired athletes were held at the 2004 Summer Paralympics in the Athens Olympic Stadium. Events were held in two disability classes.



F12

The F12 event was won by Volha Zinkevich, representing .

23 Sept. 2004, 20:00

F13

The F13 event was won by Ana I. Jimenez, representing .

25 Sept. 2004, 11:10

References

W
2004 in women's athletics